Juan Antonio Iglesias Sánchez (born 3 July 1998) is a Spanish professional footballer who plays for Getafe CF. Mainly a right-back, he can also play as a right winger.

Club career
Iglesias was born in Valladolid, Castile and León, and represented Real Valladolid as a youth. He made his senior debut with the reserves at the age of 17 on 23 August 2015, coming on as a second-half substitute for Dani Vega in a 0–0 Segunda División B home draw against Cultural y Deportiva Leonesa.

On 2 September 2017, after featuring sparingly, Iglesias joined UD Logroñés and was initially assigned to the B-team in Tercera División. He started to feature for the first team in April 2018, becoming a regular starter afterwards and being converted to a right back; in January 2019, he renewed his contract until June 2021.

On 18 July 2019, Iglesias signed for another reserve team, Getafe CF B also in the third division. He made his first team debut on 17 December of the following year, starting in a 2–1 away win against CD Anaitasuna, for the season's Copa del Rey.

Iglesias made his La Liga debut on 30 December 2020, starting in a 0–1 away loss against Atlético Madrid. Ahead of the 2021–22 campaign, he was definitely promoted to Getas main squad.

References

External links

1998 births
Living people
Footballers from Valladolid
Spanish footballers
Association football defenders
Association football wingers
La Liga players
Segunda División B players
Tercera División players
Real Valladolid Promesas players
UD Logroñés B players
UD Logroñés players
Getafe CF B players
Getafe CF footballers